Sunday Breakfast Mission, in Wilmington, Delaware, was established in 1893 to provide homeless men with a meal and a place to worship on Sunday.  Shortly after, homeless men were able to seek overnight shelter there.

Sunday Breakfast Mission is part of the Association of Gospel Rescue Missions.  The vision has grown through the years to include a residential discipleship program for men who are seeking healing from previous problems in their life, a community outreach program that provides hundreds of food boxes, household goods and clothing to those who need a hand, and special events several times each year.  These events include but are not limited to a backpack give away in August where 1700 children receive backpacks and school supplies, a Thanksgiving basket project where 800 families receive food for Thanksgiving, and the Great Thanksgiving Banquet on Thanksgiving Day when the mission opens its doors for hundreds to come share this meal.

Volunteers
Volunteers are an integral part of the Sunday Breakfast Mission.  Some volunteer their time regularly, and others who may only volunteer for the large-scale special events.  A complete list of volunteer opportunities is located on the Sunday Breakfast Mission Website.

Women and children
In an effort to reach the homeless in Wilmington and its surrounding communities, the Sunday Breakfast Mission will break ground for an addition that will house women and children.  Some of the services to be offered consist of:

Nutrition Classes
Parenting Classes
Substance Abuse/Major Life Issues Counseling
After School Programming
Meals and Shelter.

Sharing the Gospel
The Gospel of Jesus Christ is shared with each person who comes through the doors of the mission, with the hope that more souls will be won for Christ. This is done in a variety of ways, morning chapel is held for residents, while evening chapel is held for residents and those seeking shelter for the night.  Each person who receives help through the community outreach services receives the Gospel of Jesus Christ as well.

External links
Sunday Breakfast Mission

City and Gospel Rescue Missions
Organizations established in 1893
1893 establishments in Delaware
Buildings and structures in Wilmington, Delaware